HTC Desire 820q dual sim is a mid range Android-based smartphone designed and manufactured by HTC launched in October 2014. The phone belongs to HTC Desire family and was launched as a degraded variant of HTC Desire 820.

References

Desire 820q dual sim
Android (operating system) devices
Mobile phones introduced in 2014